The College Sailing Team Racing National Championship is one of the seven Inter-Collegiate Sailing Association National Championships.

Winners are awarded the Walter Cromwell Wood Bowl.

Champions

Championships by Team

References

External links 
WALTER CROMWELL WOOD BOWL

ICSA championships